The Corbiculidae are a family of clams in the mollusc order Venerida. They are known commonly as basket clams. The family name comes from the root corbus ("basket"), and was inspired by the concentric ribbing of the shells.

Clams in this family release many juveniles into the surrounding waters that have hatched inside the clams (ovoviviparous). Fertilization is internal. The juveniles are much smaller than those of the related family Sphaeriidae.

Corbicula fluminea, known commonly as the Asian or Asiatic clam, is an invasive species in many parts of the world.

Genera
 Corbicula Megerle von Mühlfeld, 1811 (central and southern Africa, Central and southern Asia)
 Geloina (southern Asia with Malaysia)
 Cyrenodonax (southern China, Vietnam)
 Cyrenobatissa (northern Vietnam)
 Batissa (Malaysia and Indonesia)
 Corbiculina (eastern Australia)
 Solielletia (Ethiopia)
 Polymesoda Rafinesque, 1820 (Gulf coast, and Atlantic coast of northern South America)
 Neocorbicula Fischer, 1887 (Gulf coast, and Atlantic coast of northern South America)
 Pseudocyrena (Caribbean side of Central America)
 Egetaria (Atlantic coast of South America)
 Villorita (eastern parts of South America)

References

 
Bivalve families
Obsolete animal taxa
Taxa named by John Edward Gray